Golden Wedding (or Golden wedding) refers to the "golden" (or 50th) wedding anniversary

It may also refer to:
 "The Golden Wedding" (La Cinquantaine), a piece of music composed by Jean Gabriel Marie in 1887.
 La Cinquantaine, a 1771 play by Desfontaines-Lavallée.